Spellbound is the nineteenth studio album by guitarist Yngwie Malmsteen, released on 5 December 2012 through his independent label Rising Force Records. Malmsteen played all of the instruments and sang all vocals on this album.

Track listing

Personnel
Yngwie Malmsteen - vocals, guitars, bass, keyboards, drums

References

 Yngwie Malmsteen Official Website

2012 albums
Yngwie Malmsteen albums